Ryongrim County is a kun, or county, in southeastern Chagang Province, North Korea.  It borders Rangrim, Changjin, Chŏnch'ŏn, Tongsin, Taehŭng, and Sŏnggan counties.  The county is mainly alpine territory.  It contains many mountain peaks, such as Wagalbong (2,260m), Ch'ŏnŭimulsan (2,032m), Rangrimsan (2,186m), Milpuldŏksan (1,577m), Ungŏsusan (2,020m), Tomabong (1,525m), Paktalsan (1,817m), Taedasan (1,463m), and Sonamsan (1,178m).

In the standard dialect of South Korea, Ryongrim loses its initial 'r' both in pronunciation and spelling.

Administrative divisions
Ryongrim County is divided into 1 ŭp (town) and 12 ri (villages):

See also
Geography of North Korea
Administrative divisions of North Korea

References

External links

Counties of Chagang